"With a Little Luck" is a single by the band Wings from their 1978 album London Town.

Writing, recording and release
"With a Little Luck" was written in Scotland and was Wings' follow-up single to the then best-selling UK Single of all time, "Mull of Kintyre." It was recorded in May 1977 in the Virgin Islands aboard the boat Fair Carol, which had been fitted with a 24-track studio, for the album London Town. The album, which had the working title Water Wings was released in March 1978 as the band's seventh album. 
During these recordings, Wings' lead guitarist Jimmy McCulloch and drummer Joe English had recorded tracks but had left, returning the band to the three-piece line-up which had recorded Band on the Run in 1973. McCartney played electric piano, bass and synthesiser in the song; English was probably on drums, while Denny Laine and Linda McCartney helped with some keyboards.

"With a Little Luck" was released in March 1978 as the first single from the album and reached No. 1 in the United States and Canada, and No. 5 in the UK. While it was at the top of the charts in the US, McCartney announced the new Wings line up featuring lead guitarist Laurence Juber and drummer Steve Holley.

The single's b-side consists of the segue of two short tracks, "Backward Traveller"/"Cuff Link", also on the album, the first of which is a song and the second an instrumental that features a heavily synthesised guitar theme.

Reception
Billboard described "With a Little Luck" as an "optimistic and celebrative" midtempo pop song that it expected to be one of McCartney's most commercially successful songs.  Cash Box said that "the lead vocals and harmonies are smooth and soothing" and praised the hooks.  Record World called it "a light, whimsical song about life's mysteries." Chris Ingham praised the song as one of the best on the album, stating it was "full of the most sensitive pop synthesizer touches." Tom Waseleski of the Beaver County Times regarded "With a Little Luck" as having "more substance" than McCartney's other soft rock tracks.

Music video
The song's music video, directed by Michael Lindsay-Hogg, aired in the UK on 9 May 1978, as part of Granada Television's Paul, a music show hosted by Paul Nicholas.

Personnel
 Paul McCartney – vocals, bass guitar, synthesizer, keyboards
 Linda McCartney – keyboards, backing vocals
 Denny Laine – keyboards, backing vocals
 Joe English – drums

Chart performance

Weekly charts

Year-end charts

Later release
"With a Little Luck" was included on the compilation album Wings Greatest (1978) and the Paul McCartney compilation albums All the Best! (1987) and Wingspan: Hits and History (2001). There are two versions of the song: the full-length version, which runs 5:45, and a promotional radio edit version, which runs 3:13 (as it cuts out, among other things, the entire instrumental interlude). The full-length version is included on Wings Greatest and the UK & Canada version of All the Best!, while the radio edit version appears on Wingspan and the US version of All the Best!

The song was featured in the closing credits of the 1979 film Sunburn starring Farrah Fawcett, Charles Grodin and Art Carney.

References

External links
Lyrics from Paul McCartney's official site
 

1978 singles
1977 songs
Billboard Hot 100 number-one singles
Cashbox number-one singles
Capitol Records singles
Music published by MPL Music Publishing
Music videos directed by Michael Lindsay-Hogg
Parlophone singles
Paul McCartney songs
RPM Top Singles number-one singles
Song recordings produced by Paul McCartney
Songs written by Paul McCartney
Paul McCartney and Wings songs